a. German trade company that operated airline services in Brazil while also providing aircraft, maintenance and aviation information.

See also
 List of airlines of Brazil
 Transportation in Brazil

References

Brazil
Airlines
Airlines, defunct